The North Shore Cheetahs are a football club and a member of the Quebec Bantam Football League (QBFL).  They were founded in 2006 after a proposal was accepted at the QBFL's AGM (Annual General Meeting).  The proposed system has both the Cheetahs and the North Shore Lions holding a joint winter evaluation camp.  Throughout the camp, the Lions take the more "polished" players and the Cheetahs (Competing in a lower division) take the rest.  They are a developmental team and the next year, the players have the rights to try out for the Lions once again.

Canadian football teams in Quebec